Upper may refer to:
 Shoe upper or vamp, the part of a shoe on the top of the foot
 Stimulant, drugs which induce temporary improvements in either mental or physical function or both
 Upper, the original film title for the 2013 found footage film The Upper Footage
 Dmitri Upper (born 1978), Kazakhstani ice hockey player

See also